The Mastery of John Coltrane, Vol. III: Jupiter Variation is a compilation album by American saxophonist John Coltrane, which features pieces recorded in 1966 and 1967, but not released until 1978 on Impulse! Records as IA 9360. All tracks were previously unreleased, at the time of release. "Number One" may also be found on the CD reissue of Expression, while "Jupiter (Variation)" and "Leo" may be found on the reissue of Interstellar Space. "Peace on Earth", with posthumous overdubbings, can be found on Infinity. The version here is the original.

Track listing

 "Number One" – 11:58
 "Peace on Earth" – 7:12
 "Jupiter (Variation)" – 6:48
 "Leo" – 11:02

Personnel
 John Coltrane – tenor saxophone, bells
 Alice Coltrane – piano (1-2)
 Jimmy Garrison (1), Charlie Haden (2) – bass
 Ray Appleton – percussion (2)
 Pharoah Sanders – tambourine (2), wooden flute (2)
 Rashied Ali – drums

References

Impulse! Records compilation albums
John Coltrane compilation albums
1978 compilation albums
Compilation albums published posthumously